A Time Called You is an upcoming South Korean streaming television series starring Ahn Hyo-seop, Jeon Yeo-been, and Kang Hoon. It is based on the Taiwanese television series Someday Or One Day. It is scheduled to be released on Netflix in the third quarter of 2023.

Synopsis 
In the year 2023, Jun-hee continues to miss her boyfriend Yeon-jun who died a year ago. She somehow travels back in time to 1998 and wakes up in the body of a different person, 18-year-old Min-ju, and meets Si-heon, who bears an uncanny resemblance to her deceased boyfriend.

Cast 
 Ahn Hyo-seop as Gu Yeon-jun / Nam Si-heon
 Jun-hee's boyfriend and a boy from 1998 who resembles him.
 Jeon Yeo-been as Han Jun-hee / Kwon Min-ju
 Yeon-jun's girlfriend still mourns over his death and the girl whose body she ends up in after traveling back in time.
 Kang Hoon as Jung In-gyu
 Si-heon's best friend has a crush on Min-ju.

Production

Development 
On February 22, 2021, Entertainment agency Npio Entertainment and Lian Contents announced that Taiwan Fox Network Group had completed the contract for the remake rights to the popular Taiwanese drama Someday Or One Day and the Korean version would be produced in earnest.

Casting 
In December 2021, it was reported that Jeon Yeo-been and Ahn Hyo-seop had received an offer to play the lead roles in the series and that they were still reviewing the offer. In February 2022, it was reported that Kang Hoon was considering the offer to appear in the series. On March 31, 2022, Netflix confirmed the production of the series along with the casting of Ahn, Jeon and Kang.

Filming 
Filming began in April 2022.

References

External links 
 
 
 
 

Upcoming Netflix original programming
Korean-language Netflix original programming
2023 South Korean television series debuts
South Korean romance television series 
2023 web series debuts
South Korean web series
South Korean drama web series
Television series about multiple time paths
South Korean time travel television series
Television series set in 2023
Television series set in 1998
South Korean television series based on non-South Korean television series
Fiction about body swapping